GPES may refer to:
 General Practice Extraction Service
 Ground Parachute Extraction System

See also 
 GPE (disambiguation)